William Albert Evans (born 1 July 1997) is a Welsh professional footballer who plays for Newport County, as a winger.

Club career
Evans was born in the Welsh village of Llangedwyn and progressed through the Shrewsbury Town youth system.

After playing for Cardiff Metropolitan University and Bala Town, Evans signed for Newport County in May 2022 for an undisclosed fee. He made his football league debut for Newport on 30 July 2022 in the starting line up for the 1-1 League Two draw against Sutton United.

Evans was deployed by Newport County manager James Rowberry at wing-back for his first two League Two matches, thereafter being selected as a striker alongside Omar Bogle. Evans scored his first goal for Newport on 24 August 2022 in the 3-2 EFL Cup second round win against Portsmouth.

International career
On 1 April 2022 Evans made his debut for the Wales C team, scoring twice in the 4-0 win against England C.

References

External links

1997 births
Living people
Welsh footballers
Cardiff Metropolitan University F.C. players
Bala Town F.C. players
Newport County A.F.C. players
Cymru Premier players
English Football League players
Association football wingers
Shrewsbury Town F.C. players